Hilsum is a surname. Notable people with the surname include:

François Hilsum (1929–2020), French political activist and journalist
Cyril Hilsum (born 1925), British physicist and academic
Ian Hilsum (born 1981), English cricketer
Lindsey Hilsum (born 1958), English television journalist and writer